The Blues is the second album by blues artist B.B. King, released in 1958 by the Bihari brothers on their budget Crown label. The album collects 12 tracks that King recorded between 1951 and 1958 for Kent and RPM. As common practice with the record label, Crown released The Blues off the strength of the single "When My Heart Beats Like a Hammer", a Top 10 R&B chart single in 1958, to help sell a collection of less-popular songs. King's signature style of single-note riffs and powerful string bends is present on the album, however it is also commanded by horn-driven performances

Critical reception

Since its inception, The Blues has received positive reviews, as seen with Mark Deming of AllMusic's review stating King was "already near the top of his class". The Rolling Stone Album Guide also commented that the collection of tracks showcased the studio band peak form, spotlighting the tracks "Ruby Lee", "Past Day" and "Boogie Woogie Woman". Billboard gave the album four out of four stars, saying that it was "A good low-price R&B set", "The vocals by King are in the old rhythm and blues tradition", and that it was "Potent stuff for the racks".

Track listing 
The original Crown LP and many reissues do not list the songwriters, producers, nor running times. Details are taken the AllMusic review and may differ from other sources.

References 

B.B. King albums
1958 albums